Shaibu Husseini (born 4 December 1970 ) is a Nigerian journalist, performing artist, Cultural administrator, PR and Media Expert and film curator. He holds a Doctorate degree in Mass Communication of the University of Lagos and was educated at the Lagos State University School of Communication and at the University of Lagos where he earned a BSc (First Class) in Mass Communication and an MSc (Distinction) respectively. He has been described as the "most consistent documentarist" on Nollywood-related topics. In 2010, he published his book, titled Moviedom, that narrates the developmental stages of Nollywood. He was the head of board of jury in 2017 at  Africa Movie Academy Awards.

Career 
Husseini is an editor at large for The Guardian newspaper. In 2014, he was honoured for his contributions to the development of Nigerian Film Industry by Nollywood Film Festival in Germany. He has been the chairman of the college of screeners and a member of jury board of Africa Movie Academy Awards for many years.

Affiliations 
 Dance Guild of Nigeria (Chairman)
 National Dance Company of Nigeria (Pioneer member)
 Federation of International Film Critics (FIPRESCI) (Secretary General, Nigerian faction)
 Federation of African Film Critic, (Secretary General, Nigerian faction)
 International Visitor Leadership Program (alumni) 
 The Berlinale Talent Campus press (alumni)
 Nigeria Oscar Selection Committee

References

Living people
Nigerian Muslims
Nigerian film critics
Nigerian journalists
1970 births